The Millwood Historic District in Millwood, Washington is a  historic district that was listed on the National Register of Historic Places in 2001.  The listing included 69 contributing buildings and one other contributing site.  It includes work by architect Harold Whitehouse.

For the Virginia historic district see Millwood Commercial Historic District

References

National Register of Historic Places in Spokane County, Washington
Buildings and structures in Spokane County, Washington
Historic districts on the National Register of Historic Places in Washington (state)